Geophis rhodogaster, also known as the rosebelly earth snake, is a snake of the colubrid family. It is found in Mexico, Guatemala, El Salvador, and Honduras.

References

Geophis
Snakes of North America
Reptiles of Mexico
Reptiles of Guatemala
Reptiles of El Salvador
Reptiles of Honduras
Taxa named by Edward Drinker Cope
Reptiles described in 1868